Behrouz Soltani born December 31, 1957, in Tehran, Iran, is a retired Iranian goalkeeper. He competed in the football tournament of the Asian Games in Delhi in 1982 as well as in the Asian Cup 1984 in Singapore.

Soltani is said to be one of the best goalkeepers of the history of the Iranian football after the Islamic Revolution in 1979.

References

1957 births
Living people
Iranian footballers
Iran international footballers
Persepolis F.C. players
Association football goalkeepers